Wrockstock was a yearly music festival featuring wizard rock, music inspired by the world of Harry Potter. Its name is a play on the music festival Woodstock. Wrockstock was first held in 2007. Organized by Abby Hupp, it was the first large Wizard Rock gathering of its kind that was not part of a general Harry Potter fan conference. It took place at the YMCA summer camp near Ozark, Missouri. The first year it was titled "WRockstock Spooktacular". It doubled as a fundraiser for the Harry Potter Alliance, a charitable foundation run by Harry Potter fans. Its final festival was in 2013.

The events were broadcast live over the internet for those unable to attend in person.

Festival history

Culture 
A recurring joke is about "Uncle Carl" who allegedly drives the Knight Bus to pick up attendees for Wrockstock.

See also

 Harry Potter fandom
 List of music festivals

References

External links

Wizard rock
Rock festivals in the United States
2007 establishments in the United States
2013 disestablishments in the United States
Music festivals established in 2007
Music festivals disestablished in 2013
Music festivals in Missouri